This is a list of 165 species in Syneches, a genus of hybotid dance flies in the family Hybotidae.

Syneches species

 Syneches acutatus Saigusa & Yang, 2003 c g
 Syneches albonotatus Loew, 1862 i c g
 Syneches amamiensis Saigusa, 1964 c g
 Syneches amazonicus  g
 Syneches ancistroides Li, Zhang & Yang, 2007 c g
 Syneches angulatus  g
 Syneches annulipes Bezzi, 1909 c g
 Syneches apicalis  g
 Syneches apiciflavus Yang, Yang & Hu, 2002 c g
 Syneches applanatus  g
 Syneches armatus Melander, 1928 c g
 Syneches ater Melander, 1927 i c g b
 Syneches avidus (Harris, 1776) c g
 Syneches bakeri Melander, 1928 c g
 Syneches barypterus Melander, 1927 c g
 Syneches basalis  g
 Syneches basiniger Yang & Wang, 1998 c g
 Syneches bicolor Walker, 1859 c g
 Syneches bigoti Bezzi, 1904 c g
 Syneches bilobatus  g
 Syneches boettcheri Frey, 1938 c g
 Syneches brevispinus Collin, 1929 c g
 Syneches brunettii Smith, 1975 c g
 Syneches calodromius Frey, 1938 c g
 Syneches capensis Smith, 1969 c g
 Syneches catarinae Smith, 1962 c g
 Syneches claripilosus Saigusa, 1964 c g
 Syneches curvineura Melander, 1927 c g
 Syneches curvipes (Fabricius, 1805) c g
 Syneches debilis Coquillett, 1895 i c g b
 Syneches deficiens (Walker, 1859) c g
 Syneches deformitarsis Saigusa, 1964 c g
 Syneches devius Collin, 1929 c g
 Syneches dichaetophorus Bezzi, 1904 c g
 Syneches dichogenus Melander, 1927 c g
 Syneches dichrous Bezzi, 1909 c g
 Syneches dinoscelis Bezzi, 1904 c g
 Syneches dominicanus Ale-Rocha & Rafael, 2004 c g
 Syneches duplex Melander, 1927 c g
 Syneches elegans Frey, 1938 c g
 Syneches elevatus Bezzi, 1968 c g
 Syneches equatoriensis  g
 Syneches eustylatus (Bigot, 1889) c g
 Syneches exilis  g
 Syneches ferrugineus (Walker, 1860) c g
 Syneches fijiensis Yang & Yao, 2007 c g
 Syneches flavipalpis Saigusa, 1964 c g
 Syneches flavipes (Brunetti, 1913) c
 Syneches fratellus Brunetti, 1913 c g
 Syneches frosti Wilder, 1974 i c g
 Syneches fujianesis Yang, 2003 c g
 Syneches fuliginosus Meijere, 1916 c g
 Syneches furcatus Saigusa & Yang, 2003 c g
 Syneches fuscescens Bezzi, 1909 c g
 Syneches fuscipennis (Brunetti, 1913) c g
 Syneches graminis Smith, 1969 c g
 Syneches grandis Frey, 1953 c g
 Syneches guangdongensis Yang & Grootaert, 2004 c g
 Syneches guangxiensis Yang, 2007 c g
 Syneches handschini Frey, 1938 c g
 Syneches helvolus Frey, 1917 c g
 Syneches henanensis (Saigusa & Yang, 2003) c g
 Syneches hirashimai Saigusa, 1990 c g
 Syneches hispidus Ale-Rocha & Vieira, 2008 c g
 Syneches hyalinus Coquillett, 1895 i c g b
 Syneches hyalopterus Bezzi, 1904 c g
 Syneches immaculatus Brunetti, 1913 c g
 Syneches inversus Curran, 1928 c g
 Syneches jamaicensis Wilder, 1974 c g
 Syneches jardinei Senior-White, 1924 c g
 Syneches jauensis Ale-Rocha & Vieira, 2008 c g
 Syneches lachaisei Charbonnel, 1998 c g
 Syneches latus Yang & Grootaert, 2004 c g
 Syneches leonensis Raffone, 1994 c g
 Syneches lividus Melander, 1928 c g
 Syneches loici Charbonnel & Daugeron, 2000 c g
 Syneches longiflagellatus Ale-Rocha & Vieira, 2008 c g
 Syneches longipennis Melander, 1902 i c g
 Syneches longistigma Frey, 1938 c g
 Syneches longiventris Melander, 1927 c g
 Syneches luanchuanensis Yang & Wang, 1998 c g
 Syneches luctifer Bezzi, 1912 c g
 Syneches luteus Wiedemann, 1830 c g
 Syneches luzonicus Frey, 1938 c g
 Syneches macrochaetosus Wilder, 1974 c g
 Syneches macrothele Smith, 1969 c g
 Syneches maculatus (Matsumura, 1916) c g
 Syneches maculithorax Senior-White, 1924 c g
 Syneches maculosum  g
 Syneches mamillosus Smith, 1969 c g
 Syneches manaos Smith, 1962 c g
 Syneches maoershanensis Yang, 2007 c g
 Syneches mars Jones, 1940 c g
 Syneches matemus Curran, 1936 c g
 Syneches matilei Charbonnel, 1998 c g
 Syneches medinai Wilder, 1974 c g
 Syneches minor Bezzi, 1904 c g
 Syneches minutus Brunetti, 1913 c g
 Syneches miyamotoi Saigusa, 1964 c g
 Syneches moraballi Smith, 1963 c g
 Syneches muscarius (Fabricius, 1794) c g
 Syneches nankunshanensis Li, Zhang & Yang, 2007 c g
 Syneches nanlingensis Yang & Grootaert, 2007 c g
 Syneches natalensis (Bigot, 1889) c g
 Syneches nebulosus Loew, 1858 c g
 Syneches neptunus Jones, 1940 c g
 Syneches nigridus Collin, 1941 c g
 Syneches obeliscus Bezzi, 1909 c g
 Syneches oedicnemus Bezzi, 1928 c g
 Syneches pallidicornis Frey, 1938 c g
 Syneches palliditarsis Brunetti, 1913 c g
 Syneches pallidus Wilder, 1974 c g
 Syneches peradeniyae Senior-White, 1924 c g
 Syneches periscelis Melander, 1928 c g
 Syneches phaeopterus Bezzi, 1905 c g
 Syneches phthia Walker i g
 Syneches planiceps Melander, 1927 c g
 Syneches platybregmus Quate, 1960 c g
 Syneches praestans Bezzi, 1912 c g
 Syneches primissimus Jones, 1940 c g
 Syneches pulliginis Collin, 1941 c g
 Syneches pullus Bezzi, 1912 c g
 Syneches pusillus Loew, 1861 i c g b
 Syneches pyramidatus Bezzi, 1905 c g
 Syneches quadraginta Jones, 1940 c g
 Syneches quadrangularis Wheeler & Melander, 1901 c g
 Syneches quadricinctus (Fabricius, 1805) c g
 Syneches rafaeli Ale-Rocha & Vieira, 2008 c g
 Syneches repletus Bezzi, 1909 c g
 Syneches ruficollis Walker, 1852 c g
 Syneches rufitibia Frey, 1953 c g
 Syneches rufus Loew, 1861 i c g b
 Syneches rusticus Brunetti, 1913 c g
 Syneches semibrunnea Meijere, 1911 c g
 Syneches semihelvolus Frey, 1938 c g
 Syneches shirozui Saigusa, 1963 c g
 Syneches shumuyuanensis Li, Zhang & Yang, 2007 c g
 Syneches signatus Bigot, 1859 c g
 Syneches simplex Walker, 1852 i c g b
 Syneches spinidorsum Bezzi, 1928 c g
 Syneches stigma (Walker, 1865) c g
 Syneches stigmaticalis Bezzi, 1909 c g
 Syneches striatus  g
 Syneches subdeficiens Frey, 1938 c g
 Syneches sublatus Yang & Grootaert, 2007 c g
 Syneches subvittatus Yang & Yao, 2007 c g
 Syneches tenebricus  g
 Syneches thoracicus (Say, 1823) i c g b
 Syneches tibetanus Yang & Yang, 1987 c g
 Syneches tomentosus Smith, 1962 c g
 Syneches tuberculitibia Smith, 1969 c g
 Syneches usherae Smith, 1969 c g
 Syneches varipes (Senior-White, 1924) c g
 Syneches varus Melander, 1928 c g
 Syneches velutinus Meijere, 1906 c g
 Syneches vidali Ale-Rocha & Vieira, 2008 c g
 Syneches vineus Wilder, 1974 c g
 Syneches visinonii Raffone, 2005 c g
 Syneches vittatus Wilder, 1974 i c g
 Syneches vittipleura Frey, 1938 c g
 Syneches walkeri Smith, 1962 c g
 Syneches xanthochromus Yang & Yang, 1987 c g
 Syneches xiaohuangshanensis Yang & Grootaert, 2007 c g
 Syneches xui Yang & Grootaert, 2004 c g
 Syneches zhejiangensis Yang & Wang, 1998 c g

Data sources: i = ITIS, c = Catalogue of Life, g = GBIF, b = Bugguide.net

References

Syneches
Articles created by Qbugbot